Big Run is a tributary of Little Muncy Creek in Lycoming County, Pennsylvania, in the United States. The stream is impaired by a high total concentration of nitrogen. A number of bridges have been constructed across it.

Course
Big Run begins in a valley in Penn Township. It flows southwest for a few tenths of a mile before turning west for a few tenths of a mile. The stream then turns south-southwest. After several tenths of a mile, it receives an unnamed tributary from the right and turns south-southwest for a few miles. In this reach, it receives one unnamed tributary from the left and one from the right before entering Franklin Township, where it receives three more unnamed tributaries from the left. The stream's valley then widens before the stream reaches the end of the valley, crosses Pennsylvania Route 118, and reaches its confluence with Little Muncy Creek.

Hydrology
Big Run is classified as impaired due to high total nitrogen levels. It is a United States Department of Agriculture-Natural Resources Conservation Service priority watershed, as well as a United States Environmental Protection Agency priority agricultural steam.

Geography and geology

The surficial geology along the valley floor in parts of the middle or upper reaches of Big Run mostly consists of alluvium, which contains stratified sand and gravel. However, there are patches of Wisconsinan Till, Wisconsinan and Illinoian Lag, Illinoian Till, and Illinoian Lag nearby, and the valley sides have surficial geology of bedrock consisting of sandstone and shale in some reaches.

The maximum extent of the ice during the Wisconsinan Glaciation crossed Big Run's course.

Watershed
The mouth of the stream is in the United States Geological Survey quadrangle of Lairdsville. However, its source is in the quadrangle of Sonestown. The stream also passes through the quadrangle of Picture Rocks. The mouth of the stream is located within  of Lairdsville.

The hydrologic unit code of the watershed of Big Run is 020502060702. A pipeline crosses the stream at one point.

History
Big Run was entered into the Geographic Names Information System on August 2, 1979. Its identifier in the Geographic Names Information System is 1192138.

See also
Derr Run, next tributary of Little Muncy Creek going downstream
Beaver Run (Little Muncy Creek), next tributary of Little Muncy Creek going upstream
List of rivers of Pennsylvania

References

Rivers of Lycoming County, Pennsylvania
Tributaries of Muncy Creek
Rivers of Pennsylvania